Ljung is a surname of Swedish origin. Notable people with the surname include:

Axel Ljung (1884–1938), Swedish gymnast who competed in the 1908 Summer Olympics
Carl-Åke Ljung,  Swedish sprint canoer
Eva Lisa Ljung, Swedish pageant titleholder
Greta M. Ljung (born 1941), Finnish-American statistician
Kim Ljung, Norwegian musician
Lennart Ljung (engineer) (born 1946), Swedish academic
Lennart Ljung (general) (1921–1990), Swedish Army general
Martin Ljung, Swedish comedian, actor and singer
Oscar Ljung (1909–1999), Swedish film actor
Ove Ljung (1918–1997), Swedish Army general
Peter Ljung (speedway rider), Swedish motorcycle speedway rider
Peter Ljung (bowling player),  Swedish ten-pin bowler
Roger Ljung, Swedish footballer
Viktor Ljung, Swedish footballer

Fictional characters
Bert Ljung

Swedish-language surnames